
Gmina Rybno is a rural gmina (administrative district) in Sochaczew County, Masovian Voivodeship, in east-central Poland. Its seat is the village of Rybno, which lies approximately 10 kilometres (6 mi) north-west of Sochaczew and 62 km (38 mi) west of Warsaw.

Villages
Gmina Rybno contains the villages and settlements of Aleksandrów, Antosin, Bronisławy, Ćmiszew Rybnowski, Ćmiszew-Parcel, Cypriany, Erminów, Jasieniec, Józin, Kamieńszczyzna, Karolków Rybnowski, Karolków Szwarocki, Konstantynów, Koszajec, Ludwików, Matyldów, Nowa Wieś, Nowy Szwarocin, Rybionek, Rybno, Sarnów, Stary Szwarocin, Wesoła, Wężyki, Złota and Zofiówka.

Neighbouring gminas
Gmina Rybno is bordered by the gminas of Iłów, Kocierzew Południowy, Młodzieszyn, Nowa Sucha and Sochaczew.

References
Polish official population figures 2006

Rybno
Gmina Rybno